Jacob Kerlin McKenty (January 19, 1827 – January 3, 1866) was an American attorney and politician.  A Democrat, he was most notable for his service as a member of the U.S. House of Representatives from Pennsylvania.

Biography
Jacob K. McKenty was born in Douglassville, Pennsylvania on January 19, 1827, the son of Henry McKenty and Eleanor (or Elenor) McKenty.  He graduated from Yale College in 1848 and Yale Law School in 1850.

He completed his studies by reading law with William Strong, was admitted to the bar in 1851 and commenced practice in Reading, Pennsylvania.  He served as prosecuting attorney of Berks County, Pennsylvania from 1856 to 1859.

McKenty was elected as a Democrat to the Thirty-sixth Congress to fill the vacancy caused by the death of John Schwartz and served from December 3, 1860 to March 3, 1861.  He was not a candidate for reelection in 1860, and resumed the practice of his profession in Reading.  He was an unsuccessful candidate for the Democratic nomination for Congress in 1862 and 1864.

McKenty died in Douglassville on January 3, 1866, and was buried at St. Gabriel's Episcopal Church Cemetery in Douglasville.

References

Sources

Books

External sources
 
 
 Jacob Kerlin McKenty at The Political Graveyard

1827 births
1866 deaths
Yale College alumni
Yale Law School alumni
Politicians from Reading, Pennsylvania
Pennsylvania lawyers
19th-century American Episcopalians
Democratic Party members of the United States House of Representatives from Pennsylvania
19th-century American politicians
Burials in Pennsylvania
19th-century American lawyers